Sofa Thowfeek commonly spelled as Sofa Thaufeeq (11 August 1967) is a Maldivian singer.

Early life and career
Sofa Thaufeeq was born on 11 August 1967. Her father, Mohamed Thaufeeq was mostly known for his strong voice in the radio program Keerithi Rasoolaage Siyarathu while her mother, Aishath Fareedha is a homemaker and singer. She is the sister of notable local playback singers Shifa Thaufeeq and Asim Thaufeeq. At the age of eight, she was selected in her school's chorus group, where she started singing and performing on school concerts and locals events.

While studying in Aminiya School, she performed the song "Hindhu Emaa Kan'du Thereyn" in the year's national event drill. The performance caught the eyes of several music composers which enabled her to ge the breakthrough in film industry. During her last year of study, she was awarded as the best performer from the senior age group in Interschool Singing Competition. In 1985, she rendered the song "Haalathu Adhu Mivanee" for the film Fidhaa which became an instant chartbuster among the music listeners. The song "Maheynethidhaane" from the album Varihama and featuring actors, Aishath Shiranee and Ahmed Ghiyas is noted to be one of the most iconic songs performed by Thaufeeq.

In 1996, the Government of Maldives honoured her with the National Award of Recognition, which she attributed as her biggest achievement. She then becomes a consistent face on stage shows including "Galaxy", "Muziky Fannaanuge Show" and other local events and shows. Apart from singing, she became a mentor for students participating in the Interschool Singing Competition and also penned lyrics for several of the songs performed by her for the albums including, Ranmuiy (1996) and Ranthari (1997). According to Thaufeeq, the album Handhaan, produced by herself, is the closes project to her as the album consists of songs recorded by her family members including, her mother and father. The album was released as a memoire of her father, who died while working on the project. Thaufeeq penned few tracks for the album too. Her husband, Hassan Nizam died at the age of 52, in 2015.

Discography

Feature Film

Non Film Songs

Accolades

References 

Living people
People from Malé
1967 births
Maldivian playback singers